Richard (Dick) Burke (June 4, 1934 – March 9, 2008) was the co-founder of Trek Bicycle Corporation.  Trek is known among cyclists for making the bikes that Lance Armstrong rode in his Tour de France victories.

Early history 
Burke was born in Chicago in 1934 and moved to Milwaukee when he enrolled at Marquette University. After graduating, he worked for several companies including an appliance distribution business.

Trek Bicycle 
In December, 1975, Richard (Dick) Burke and Bevil Hogg established Trek Bicycle as a wholly owned subsidiary of Roth Corporation, a Milwaukee-based appliance distributor. In early 1976, with a payroll of five, Trek started manufacturing steel touring frames in Waterloo, Wisconsin, taking aim at the mid to high-end market do by Japanese and Italian made models.

Family 
Burke is survived by his wife Camille, five children and nine grandchildren.

Two of his children are John Burke, the current president of the company he founded, as well as Mary Burke a former executive at Trek Bicycle Corporation and Democratic candidate for Governor of Wisconsin in the 2014 election.

Mr. Burke’s first marriage, to Elaine Sachs, ended in divorce. Besides his son, of Madison, Wis., Mr. Burke is survived by his wife, Camille; four daughters, Mary Burke; Kathleen Seiberlich, Michele Deubel, and Sharon Jonas; a stepbrother, Mike Trizil of Chicago; and nine grandchildren.

References 

1934 births
2008 deaths
Businesspeople from Chicago
Businesspeople from Milwaukee
Marquette University alumni
20th-century American businesspeople